The 1932–33 season saw Newport County return to the Football League following their one-season spell back in the Southern League. The club again finished in the re-election places at the end of the season but this time were re-elected.

Season review

Results summary

Results by round

Fixtures and results

Third Division South

FA Cup

Welsh Cup

League table

Election

External links
 Newport County 1932-1933 : Results
 Newport County football club match record: 1933
 Welsh Cup 1932/33

References

 Amber in the Blood: A History of Newport County. 

1932-33
English football clubs 1932–33 season
1932–33 in Welsh football